SFC Slutsk is a Belarusian association football club based in Slutsk, Minsk Oblast.

History

Origins and predecessor clubs
There was competitive football in Slutsk as early as 1913, with a Slutsk team entering the third season of the republican competition in 1926, but it did not enter a BSSR competition again until 1936.  From the 1940s, the city of Slutsk was represented at a very low level by a team called Slutsk Spartak. 

During World War 2, the city's football pitch was the site of "fierce battles" and extensive trench construction. In 1948, the city's executive committee decided to promote and fund football. The same year, the city stadium, originally built 1935, was rebuilt. In addition to government funding, the city team was funded by the "trade union voluntary sports society and individual enterprises." Despite this, by 1974, the Slutsk team faced financial difficulties and dropped out of the BSSR republican championship. There were short-lived revivals in 1980 and the late 1980s, before the city registered a self-supporting club in 1990. The name of the Slutsk team changed frequently in the 1990s, based on sponsorship.

In 1997, there was a new sports center in Slutsk funded by Nikolai Prudnik, of the local sugar refinery. The sports complex created a football team funded by Oleg Karanevsky, a physical educator. It was initially effectively a company team for the sugar plant, with all the players working for the plant, but later players from previous Slutsk representative teams joined. The coach was Alexander Dubitsky.

Current team
The current team was founded in 1998 as Slutsksakhar Slutsk after success in local futsal and financial guarantees from the sugar refinery. Between 1998 and 2007, they played in the Minsk Oblast championship. In 2008, they joined the Belarusian Second League. In 2010, they finished in second place and were granted a promotion to the First League in 2011. In early 2011, the team changed its name to Slutsk. After becoming a "city club", initially all home matches were played at a stadium in Salihorsk. Starting in 2012, after expansion of the Slutsk city stadium, with a new administrative building, new stands, and a pitch extension, the team began playing at their proper home ground. The pitch had initially been too small, as a running track around the field had been only 360 meters instead of the standard 400. In 2013, Slutsk became the league leader in home attendance. The town stadium would be further renovated in the 2014 season.

In 2014, the club signed Japanese player Yōsuke Saitō, who would score 7 goals in 17 games in his debut season.

In the 2015 off-season, Slutsk was one of the few Belarusian teams to play friendlies abroad, facing Danish and Russian clubs in Turkey.

In the following seasons, the club went through a series of management changes. In 2015, long-time head coach Yuriy Krot was fired, replaced by Vyachaslaw Hryharaw, who was also a player. In 2017, Vitaliy Pavlov was appointed head coach. 

The same year, Oleg Karanevsky, club chairman, was detained for allegedly taking a bribe.

In 2018, forward Yevgeniy Shikavka was the first FC Slutsk player to represent Belarus at the national level.

2020 season

In 2020, the club suffered a financial setback when the major sponsor, a local sugar refinery, withdrew after suffering losses. The decision was made by new management, since the former head was imprisoned.

FC Slutsk gained global media attention during the COVID-19 pandemic. As the Belarusian league was one of the few in the world still playing (along with Nicaragua and Tajikistan - and as of April 2020, Taiwan), an online following began around FC Slutsk, started by Australians who found the name funny. This led to coverage of the club by international media outlets including the BBC, The New York Times , NBC, the Australian Broadcasting Corporation, Russia Today, and the Süddeutsche Zeitung. The new fandom also had financial benefits: when the club's financial problems came to light, online fans raised "over $3,000 in less than two weeks" to help the club, and led to new sponsorship from Parimatch, a Ukrainian betting company. The movement also led to the adoption of a club song, "We love our Slutsk", composed by Andy Bajana and performed by Yury Trubila, which was played at home games starting in April 2020.

As of 2020, despite the reduction in financial support from the sugar factory, a majority of players continued to live "on the second floor of the sugar factory dormitory allocated for them".

On 30 June 2020, Slutsk manager Vitaly Pavlov was fired after an extended period of poor performances in the league. His replacement was Alexander Konchits. In October 2020, Konchits was replaced by Alexander Brazevich after the club slipped into the relegation zone.

On November 27, 2020, prior to the last game of the season against FC Smolevichi, Slutsk announced that most of the team had been diagnosed with COVID-19. Since the result would not affect the league standings, both teams agreed to cancel the game.

Current squad
As of March 2023

League and Cup history

Honours
Champions - Belarusian First League - 2013

Managers
 Yuriy Krot (2005–15)
 Vyachaslaw Hryharaw (2015–2016)
 Vitaliy Pavlov (2017–2020)
 Alexander Konchits (2020)
 Aleksandr Brazevich (2020–)

References

External links
 Official Website 

Football clubs in Belarus
Sport in Minsk Region
1998 establishments in Belarus
Association football clubs established in 1998